Penelope Anne Mountjoy  is an archaeologist from the United Kingdom who specializes in Mycenaean ceramics. Mountjoy has written several books and received numerous awards and fellowships to continue her research on Greek pottery.

Education 
Mountjoy undertook a Bachelor of Arts (BA) degree in classics at the University of Bristol and a Master of Philosophy (MPhil) degree from the University of London before returning to Bristol for her PhD. She is a member of the British School at Athens.

Career and Honours
Mountjoy is a recipient of a Seymour Gitin Distinguished Professor Fellowship from the Albright Institute of Archaeological Research in 2014 to study Mycenaean decorated pottery in Cyprus and the South Levant. She has also obtained the Alexander von Humboldt Fellowship, Glassman Hall Fellowship, and was elected as a Corresponding Member of the German Archaeological Institute. On 5 May 1988 she was also elected as a Fellow of the Society of Antiquaries of London (FSA) Mountjoy is currently working on Mycenaean Pottery IIIC (1200-1050) in Cyprus, Turkey and Israel.  She is also an experienced draftsman and uses that skill to teach students through "College Year in Athens". Her book, "Mycenaean Pottery: An Introduction" is streamlined for accessibility by introducing the topic and backing it up with a brief description of archaeological and historical background. At the time this book was the most up to date and available books on the topic. While a later book, “Troy 9: Troy VI Middle, VI Late and VII. The Mycenaean Pottery” targets a more experienced audience by presenting the pottery using stratigraphy and details of excavation.

Bibliography

Selected books 
1983. (with Kunze, Emil) Orchomenos V: Mycenaean pottery from Orchomenos, Eutresis and other Boeotian sites (Abhandlungen 89).
1985. The Archaeology of cult: the sanctuary at Phylakopi (British School of Archaeology at Athens 18). London, British school of archaeology at Athens.
1986. Mycenaean Decorated Pottery: A Guide to Identification. Gothenberg.
1993. Mycenaean Pottery: An Introduction. Oxford University Press.
1999. Regional Mycenaean decorated pottery. Berlin, Deutsches Archäologisches Institut.
2008. The Mycenaean and the Minoan Pottery: the Johann Wolfgang Goethe University Collections. Weisbaden.
2003. Knossos the south house. The British School at Athens.
2017. Troy 9: Troy VI Middle, VI Late and VII. The Mycenaean Pottery. Habelt.
2018. Decorated Pottery in Cyprus and Philistia in the 12th Century BC: Cypriot IIIC and Philistine IIIC, Vols. I&II. Austrian Academy of Sciences.

Selected articles 

 
  
  
  
  
  
Mountjoy, Penelope A., et al. (2017) “The Sea Peoples: A View from the Pottery.” in “Sea Peoples” Up-to-Date: New Research on Transformation in the Eastern Mediterranean in 13th-11th Centuries BCE, 1st ed., Austrian Academy of Sciences Press, pp. 355–78

References 

British women archaeologists
Fellows of the Society of Antiquaries of London
21st-century archaeologists
Living people
Year of birth missing (living people)
Alumni of the University of Bristol
Women classical scholars